Otteana dilinhensis is a species of cricket in the subfamily Landrevinae, found in Vietnam.

Systematics 
The species was first described in 1988 by Daniel Otte and placed under Pteroplistinae as Pteroplistus dilinhensis. A reassessment in 1990 by  moved it to Otteana.

References 

Crickets
Orthoptera of Indo-China
Insects described in 1988